Lockheed Orion or Lockheed Martin Orion may refer to:
 Lockheed Model 9 Orion (1931), a single engine airliner
 Lockheed P-3 Orion (1959), a maritime patrol aircraft, with several variants
 Orion (spacecraft) (in development), a crewed spacecraft, co-developed by Lockheed Martin